Sassa  is a frazione  in the Province of L'Aquila in the Abruzzo region of Italy.  After the 2009 L'Aquila earthquake, it has a population of about 2500 inhabitants considering small villages around this frazione.

The frazione of Sassa is composed by twelve villages: Brecciasecca, Colle di Sassa, Collefracido, Collemare, Foce di Sassa, Genzano di Sassa, Pagliare di Sassa, Palombaia di Sassa, Poggio Santa Maria, San Martino, Sassa e Sassa Scalo.

As mentioned, the territory has a dozen villages which until 1927, formed the independent town of Sassa. Sassa tries often consider the whole territory and villas that compose it; with Sassa is therefore aimed at the following centers:

Transport 
Sassa has a station on the Terni–Sulmona railway, with trains to Terni, Rieti and L'Aquila.

References

Frazioni of L'Aquila
Former municipalities of the Province of L'Aquila